HMS Turbulent was one of four s ordered for the Ottoman Navy and taken over by the Royal Navy during the First World War.

Description
The Talismans were designed by Armstrong Whitworth for the Ottoman Navy, but were sub-contracted to Hawthorn Leslie and Company for building. They displaced . They were powered by three Parsons direct-drive steam turbines, each driving one propeller shaft, using steam provided by three Yarrow boilers. The ships' complement was 102 officers and ratings.

The Talisman-class ships were heavily armed for their time, shipping five single QF  Mark IV guns. Two of the guns were side-by-side on the forecastle. The other guns were carried on the centreline; one between the first and second funnels, one after the searchlight platform and one on a bandstand on the quarterdeck. All the guns had half-shields. The ships were designed to accommodate three above water twin mounts for  torpedoes, but only two mounts were fitted in British service.

Construction and career
The vessel was originally to have been named Ogre, but was renamed whilst under construction, on 15 February 1915. She was launched on 5 January 1916 and completed in May 1916.

She served with the 10th Destroyer Flotilla of the Grand Fleet from her completion. She was sunk on 1 June 1916 at the Battle of Jutland by the German battleship  SMS Westfalen with the deaths of 90 crew members, and the surviving 13 became prisoners of war. The wrecksite is designated as a protected place under the Protection of Military Remains Act 1986.

Notes

Bibliography

External links
 SI 2008/0950 Designation under the Protection of Military Remains Act 1986
 Battle of Jutland Crew Lists Project - HMS Turbulent Crew List

 

Talisman-class destroyers
World War I destroyers of the United Kingdom
Maritime incidents in 1916
Ships sunk at the Battle of Jutland
Protected Wrecks of the United Kingdom
Ships built on the River Tyne
1916 ships